Rūta is a common Lithuanian and Latvian female given name. 

People with the given name include:

Rūta Bunkutė (born 1979), fitness competitor
Rūta Gajauskaitė (born 1989), Lithuanian figure skater
Ruta Gerulaitis (born 1955), American tennis player
Rūta Jokubonienė (1930–2010), Lithuanian textile artist
Rūta Meilutytė (born 1997), Lithuanian swimmer
Rūta Paškauskienė (born 1977), Lithuanian table tennis player
Rūta Ščiogolevaitė-Damijonaitienė (born 1981), Lithuanian singer
Rūta Šepetys (born 1967), Lithuanian-American writer
Rūta Skujiņa (1907–1964), Latvian poet
Rūta Vanagaitė (born 1955), Lithuanian theatre critic, writer, journalist and historian

See also
 Rūta Society, a Lithuanian cultural society active in 1909–1914
 Ruta (disambiguation)

Lithuanian feminine given names
Latvian feminine given names